Hot Ice is a 1987 Australian film about a private detective.

References

External links

Australian television films
1987 television films
1987 films
1980s English-language films